Jeremiah Connolly (1875 – 2 October 1935) was an Independent Liberal Member of Parliament for Mid-Canterbury, in the South Island of New Zealand.

Early life
Connolly was born in Geraldine in 1875 and educated at Hilton School. He was a farmer. In 1902 Connolly purchased the Raukapuka Estate, which he sold in 1919. He then acquired the Langley Estate at Rakaia.

During World War I Connolly was a member of the National Efficiency Board (1917–18) and of various patriotic societies.

Member of Parliament

He represented the Mid-Canterbury electorate in the New Zealand House of Representatives until his death in 1935.

In 1935, he was awarded the King George V Silver Jubilee Medal.

Death
He collapsed and died in a taxi-cab in Wellington, when going from Parliament to his hotel. He was stated to have had heart problems.

References

Further reading

 p.7.

1875 births
1935 deaths
Independent MPs of New Zealand
New Zealand farmers
New Zealand Liberal Party MPs
Members of the New Zealand House of Representatives
New Zealand MPs for South Island electorates
People from Geraldine, New Zealand
Unsuccessful candidates in the 1928 New Zealand general election
Unsuccessful candidates in the 1925 New Zealand general election